Greg Werner (born October 21, 1966) is a former American football tight end who played in the National Football League. He played college football at DePauw.

College career
Werner played football and baseball at DePauw University. As senior, he caught 47 passes for 634 yards and nine touchdowns and was named an NCAA Division III All-American. He finished his collegiate career with 119 career pass receptions for 1,742 yards. Werner was inducted into the DePauw Athletic Hall of Fame in 2006.

Professional career
Werner was signed by the New York Jets as an undrafted free agent in 1989. He was released and re-signed by the Jets multiple times during his rookie season. Werner finished the year with eight receptions for 115 yards in 10 games played. Werner was signed by the Philadelphia Eagles, but was cut at the end of training camp.

Personal life
Werner's son, Pete Werner, played college football at Ohio State and was selected by the New Orleans Saints in the 2021 NFL Draft and another son, Dan, played at Harvard.

References

1966 births
Living people
Players of American football from Indiana
American football tight ends
DePauw Tigers football players
New York Jets players
Philadelphia Eagles players
DePauw Tigers baseball players